The Viaero Center, previously known as the Kearney Event Center and Firstier Event Center, is a 5,000-seat multi-purpose arena in Kearney, Nebraska. It opened in November 2000 as the Tri-City Arena.  It is home to the 2016 USHL Clark Cup Champions Tri-City Storm ice hockey, and former teams, the Nebraska Cranes basketball and Tri-City Diesel arena football. Seating capacity for hockey, basketball and arena football is 4,047.

The arena features 20 luxury suites and also plays host to concerts, trade shows, conventions and other events.

References

External links
 Official site

Indoor arenas in Nebraska
Indoor ice hockey venues in the United States
Sports venues in Nebraska
Buildings and structures in Kearney, Nebraska
Tourist attractions in Buffalo County, Nebraska
Sports in the Tri-Cities, Nebraska
2000 establishments in Nebraska
Sports venues completed in 2000
Basketball venues in Nebraska